"Goodbye My Love" is a song written and performed by James Brown. Released as a single in 1968, it charted #9 R&B and #31 Pop.

References

James Brown songs
Songs written by James Brown
1968 singles
King Records (United States) singles
1968 songs